Kuruvambalam  is a village within the Perinthalmanna Taluk of Malappuram district in the state of Kerala, India.

Demographics
 India census, Kuruvambalam had a population of 9769 with 4550 males and 5219 females. For administrative purposes, the village of Valapuram immediately south is included within the Revenue Village of Kuruvamabalam. At the 2011 census, the population had increased to 10,756.

Transportation
Kuruvambalam village connects to other parts of India through Perinthalmanna town.  National highway No.66 passes through Tirur and the northern stretch connects to Goa and Mumbai.  The southern stretch connects to Cochin and Trivandrum.   Highway No.966 goes to Palakkad and Coimbatore.   The nearest airport is at Kozhikode.  The nearest major railway station is at Tirur.

References

Villages in Malappuram district
Perinthalmanna area